Major Operation is a 1971 science fiction book by Northern Irish author James White, the third volume in the Sector General series. The book collects together a series of five short stories, all of which were originally published in New Worlds magazine.

Stories 

"Invader" – A series of clumsy accidents at the hospital lead Conway to suspect an alien presence.
"Vertigo" (1968) – a spinning ship (from the planet later nicknamed 'Meatball') is 'rescued' and brought to the hospital.
"Blood Brother" (1969) – Meatball's natural doctors are discovered.
"Meatball (1966) – Additional investigation reveals more about Meatball's doctors.
"Major Operation (1971) – A gigantic patient on Meatball fights medical treatment.

References

1971 short story collections
1970s science fiction works
Sector General
Short story collections by James White (author)
Works originally published in New Worlds (magazine)
Ballantine Books books